Vladimír "Vlado" Clementis (20 September 1902 Tisovec – 3 December 1952 Prague) was a Slovak minister, politician, lawyer, publicist, literary critic, author and a prominent member of the Czechoslovak Communist Party. He married Lída Pátková, the daughter of a branch director of the Czech Mortgage Bank in Bratislava, in March 1933. He became a Communist MP in 1935. After the German occupation of Czechoslovakia shortly before the beginning of World War II, in 1938, he emigrated to Paris. His criticism of the Molotov–Ribbentrop Pact in 1939 (However, as M. Gešper reminds, this criticism was not public ), contradicted the policies of the Czechoslovak Communist Party exiled to Moscow and triggered an intra-party investigation overseen by Viliam Široký (who came to Paris from Moscow). 

Clementis graduated from the Law Faculty of the Charles University in Prague, where he became involved in the socialist movement, and the culmination of these activities was the founding of the DAV magazine, which he led ideologically, organizationally and editorially. Clementis was initially involved in the Detvan association and later in the Free Association of Socialist Students from Slovakia, on whose platform DAV was founded. During his studies in Prague, he was interested in the philosophy of Rádl, Krejčí and Forster, reports Drug . For the DAV, he acquired a whole range of writers, intellectuals, often from opposing opinion circles, which was Clementis' great virtue - respect for opinion plurality. He published his statements and works in their entirety, and thus names such as M. Rázus, M. Urban, J. Smrek, G. Vámoš and T. Gašpar got into DAV. In addition, together with Novomeský and modernist artists such as Fulla and Galanda, they designed original modern graphics supplemented by contemporary artists. Another contribution of Clementis was the sociographic tours of the Davists to Kysuce and Horehronie, which contributed to the awareness of the social situation at that time. Clementis also contributed to the addition of the young R10 generation to the ranks of DAV (Matuška, Husák). Within the DAV, he also stirred up a discussion about the bloody events in Košúty with international impact (he wrote letters to Rolland, Barbusse and Gorky) and also actively acted as a "poverty advocate" in the trial of Štefan Major. 

At the outbreak of World War II in September 1939, he was put into prison as a known Communist, and later evacuated to a British internment camp. After his release, he decided to spend the war in London, where he broadcast speeches on the radio calling for all Slovaks to fight in the Slovak National Uprising against the Nazis. During the Bratislava–Brno offensive he unsuccessfully complained to Marshal Ivan Konev about the mass rapes by Red Army soldiers against Czechoslovak civilians. Returning in 1945, he became Vice-Minister of Foreign Affairs under the first post-war government. After a coup d'état, which he helped organise, he succeeded Jan Masaryk as Foreign Minister. In 1948, in his new role, he played a decisive role in organising Czechoslovakia's part in Operation Balak by providing assistance to the newly founded Israeli Air Force. In 1950, he was forced to resign amid accusations of being a "deviationist". He was then arrested and charged for an illegal attempt to cross the state boundaries, later changed to the more serious crime of being a "bourgeois nationalist" and participating in a Trotskyite-Titoite-Zionist conspiracy. After being convicted in the Slánský show trial, he was hanged, along with Rudolf Slánský, on 3 December 1952. His ashes were scattered on a road close to Prague. His wife, Lída, received only her husband's two pipes and tobacco and was discharged from a prison.

In the famous photograph from 21 February 1948 (the story is described in The Book of Laughter and Forgetting by Milan Kundera), Vladimír Clementis stands next to Klement Gottwald, who later, after the coup d'état, became the President of Czechoslovakia. When Vladimír Clementis was executed in 1952, he was erased from the photograph (along with the photographer Karel Hájek).

Clementis was rehabilitated in 1963 together with other davists, and a year later Clementis's book Unfinished Chronicle was published; in 1967 a selection of his work, Air of our Times, was published; in 1968 Letters from Prison, which he wrote with his wife Lída; and in 1977 the selection About Culture and Art. In 1968, he was awarded the title Hero of the Czechoslovakia, in memoriam.

Reflection 
 
The sculpture of Vladimír Clementis was unveiled by the head of diplomacy Ján Kubiš and Prime Minister Robert Fico at the Ministry of Foreign Affairs.  Slovak Matica dedicated a conference in Bratislava  and a lecture in his native Tisovec to Clementis ; and dedicated a bust to Vladimír Clementis in Rimavská Sobota (Alley of National Heroes). In 2002 , 2012  and 2022, three conferences about Vladimir Clementis were organized in Bratislava. In 2022, Matica slovenská and ASA Institute organized a conference for Vladimír Clementis (the 120th anniversary) and Vladimír Mináč (the 120th anniversary) .

See also 
 Klement Gottwald
 Photo manipulation
 The Book of Laughter and Forgetting

Footnotes

References 
 
 Biography at the Ministry of Foreign Affairs of the Czech Republic

1902 births
1952 deaths
People from Tisovec
People from the Kingdom of Hungary
Slovak Lutherans
Members of the Central Committee of the Communist Party of Czechoslovakia
Communist Party of Slovakia (1939) politicians
Foreign ministers of Czechoslovakia
Government ministers of Czechoslovakia
Members of the Chamber of Deputies of Czechoslovakia (1935–1939)
Members of the Interim National Assembly of Czechoslovakia
Members of the Constituent National Assembly of Czechoslovakia
Members of the National Assembly of Czechoslovakia (1948–1954)
Slánský trial defendants
Executed Czechoslovak people
Executed politicians
People executed by the Czechoslovak Socialist Republic by hanging
Executed Slovak people
20th-century Lutherans
Slovak anti-fascists